Indirect presidential elections were held in Brazil on 25 February 1891. They were the first presidential elections in the country following the overthrow of the monarchy, with the president and vice president elected by members of Congress. Under the constitution promulgated by Congress on 24 February 1891, the election was held the following day and the winners took office on 26 February.

Manuel Deodoro da Fonseca (who had been Head of the Provisional Government since 15 November 1889, when the monarchy was overthrown) was elected president, while Floriano Vieira Peixoto was elected vice president.

Results

President

Vice President

References

Presidential elections in Brazil
Brazil
President
Brazil
Elections of the First Brazilian Republic